Ing. Alberto Acuña Ongay International Airport , also known as Campeche International Airport, is an international airport located in Campeche, Campeche, Mexico. It handles national and international air traffic of the city of Campeche. It's operated by Aeropuertos y Servicios Auxiliares, a federal government-owned corporation.

In 2021, the airport handled 134,601 passengers, and in 2022 it handled 144,013 passengers.

Airlines and destinations

Statistics

Passengers

Gallery

See also 

 List of the busiest airports in Mexico

References

External links

 Campeche International Airport

Airports in Campeche
Campeche City